Alicia Garza (born January 4, 1981) is an American civil rights activist and writer known for co-founding the international Black Lives Matter movement. She has organized around the issues of health, student services and rights, rights for domestic workers, ending police brutality, anti-racism, and violence against transgender and gender non-conforming people of color. Her editorial writing has been published by The Guardian, The Nation, Rolling Stone, and Truthout. She currently directs Special Projects at the National Domestic Workers Alliance and is the Principal at the Black Futures Lab.

Early life and education
Garza was born to a single mother in Oakland California, on January 4, 1981. Her first four years were spent in San Rafael, living with her African-American mother and her mother's twin brother. After that she lived with her mother and her Jewish stepfather, and she grew up as Alicia Schwartz in a mixed-raced and mixed-religion household. Garza identifies as Jewish. The family lived first in San Rafael and then Tiburon, and ran an antiques business, assisted later by her brother Joey, eight years her junior. When she was 12 years old, Alicia engaged in activism, promoting school sex education about birth control. Enrolling in the University of California, San Diego (UCSD), she continued her activism by working at the student health center and joining the student association calling for higher pay for the university's janitors. In her final year at college, she helped organize the first Women of Color Conference, a university-wide convocation held at UCSD in 2002. She graduated in 2002 with a degree in anthropology and sociology.

Personal

Malachi Garza 
During a blockage at Bay Bridge in 2003, Garza saw Malachi in a crowd, doing a role of security. Through that same network a few weeks later, Garza received an email about the School of Unity and Liberation  (SOUL). When she showed up to her interview, her interviewer (Malachi) was forty minutes late. Garza says in the 2016 YBCA 100 Summit, “a twenty minute interview turned into a four hour conversation, I remember leaving there and saying 'I met my soulmate’”. In 2004, Alicia came out as queer to her family. In 2008, she married Malachi and took the name Garza, settling in Oakland. In September 2021, Garza announced that the two had ended their relationship after 17 years.

Tattoo 
Garza has a tattoo emblazoned on her chest that reads:I am not wrong: Wrong is not my name

My name is my own my own my own

and I can't tell you who the hell set things up like this

but I can tell you that from now on my resistance

my simple and daily and nightly self-determination

may very well cost you your lifeThese are the final lines in June Jordan's "Poem about My Rights"

The sentiment of #BlackLivesMatter has deep roots in African American culture. These roots are what Garza inscribed on her skin.

Mother 
On March 28, 2018, Garza announced via her Instagram page, "I wish this was a better update. Moms has a glioblastoma—a very aggressive brain tumor. The cancer cells have spread all over her brain". A month later on April 30, 2018 Alicia said “ Moms passed away peacefully earlier today, surrounded by her family. I was holding her hand when she died…”.

Career

School of Unity and Liberation (SOUL) 
In 2003 Garza returned to the Bay Area, where she began a training program in political education with the School of Unity and Liberation (SOUL) that taught young people of color how to organize, by placing them with local community based organizations in West Oakland.  Garza began working with Just Cause Oakland, where she met her former partner Malachi Garza, a transgender man and a community activist.

People United for a Better Life in Oakland (PUEBLO) 
Completing her internship at SOUL, Garza joined a campaign that researched the relationship between increasing economic security for People Of Color, and increased community security. She said in an Interview with Vanity Fair: “Building economic opportunities in local communities is a better alternative to dealing with crime and violence, than increasing police budgets” Her initial project with PUEBLO was to gather community resistance in East Oakland against a proposed Walmart.

When the nearby work committee pulled their assistance in the action against Walmart, PUEBLO was unable to win. In 2005, the first Walmart in that area opened.

People Organized to Win Employment Rights (POWER) 
After leaving PUEBLO, Garza began working with the UC Student Association for a year promoting activism to university students. In 2005 she joined People Organized to Win Employment Rights (POWER) in Bayview–Hunters Point.

POWER is a "multi-racial and multi-lingual grassroots organization of African Americans and Latinas committed to winning economic, environmental, racial, and gender justice. Rooted in issues-based campaigns, leadership development and movement building, POWER builds the collective strength of working-class families to control the destinies of their communities and workplaces."

She advocated for increasing funding for accessible public housing and maintenance, in order to assist homeowners in moving underground power lines. This was a $7 billion task to transform 250 acres of land, including the contaminated area with radioactivity, toward the area of the Bayview least served by public transportation. Free transit for young people was approved, and expanded to seniors and people with disabilities.  The same year, POWER organizers published a book analyzing how capitalism and imperialism were threatening the livelihoods of San Francisco and the Bay Area's working-class communities of color. In opposition to the changes they saw in their communities, POWER formed a coalition between other groups against the project's developer, Lennar. With Gavin Newsom, much of the Democratic Party establishment and Lennar opposing them, POWER lost. As a result, the respective ballot initiative, Proposition F lost 37 percent to 63 percent.

National Domestic Workers Alliance 
Following a brief sabbatical, Alicia Garza joined the National Domestic Workers Alliance creating a program focused on Black domestic workers. Shortly before this, Garza founded Black Lives Matter with Patrisse Cullors and Opal Tometi.

Black Lives Matter 

With Opal Tometi and Patrisse Cullors, Garza birthed the Black Lives Matter hashtag. Garza is credited with inspiring the slogan when, after the July 2013 acquittal of George Zimmerman of murder in the death of Trayvon Martin, she posted on Facebook: "I continue to be surprised at how little Black lives matter... Our lives matter." Cullors shared this with the hashtag #BlackLivesMatter. She was also struck by the similarities of Trayvon Martin to her younger brother, Joey, feeling that Joey could have been killed instead. The organization Black Lives Matter was spurred on by the killings of Black people by police, racial disparities within the U.S. criminal legal system, mass incarceration, police militarization, and over-criminalization. In particular, the movement was born and Garza's post became popularized after protests emerged in Ferguson, Missouri, following the death of Michael Brown.

Garza led the 2015 Freedom Ride to Ferguson, organized by Cullors and Darnell Moore, that launched the building of BlackLivesMatter chapters across the United States and the world. However, Garza does not think of the Black Lives Matter Movement as her creation; she feels her work is only a continuation of the resistance led by Black people in America. The movement and Garza are credited for popularizing the use of social media for mass mobilization in the United States; a practice called "mediated mobilization". This practice has been used by other movements, such as the #MeToo movement.

Lady Don't Take No 
On April 10, 2020 Garza debuted her podcast Lady Don’t Take No, named after the song ”Lady Don't Tek No" by Latyrx. It is a tribute to the Bay Area, where she discusses “political commentary with a side of beauty recommendations”

Book 
Garza's first book, The Purpose of Power: How We Come Together When We Fall Apart, was published in October 2020 by Penguin Random House. Described as "an essential guide", the book tells Garza's story as an activist and shares lessons for future activists.“My experience with BLM toughened my skin and softened my heart.. it taught me how to recommit to work that broke my heart every day,” Garza said in the book. When asked about this quote in an interview with Angelica Ross, Garza responded, “I wanted people to see under the hood and under the curtains of what goes on in this work.. I’ve had the experience of feeling like I was not cut out for this work, and I wanted to humanize the movement”.

Notability 
Garza was one of the protesters holding back the BART train in Oakland, CA in 2014. Once this protest ended, Garza started a new generation of civil rights leaders. Garza is now the 27th most influential African American (behind her counterpart, Patrisse Cullors) on the Root 100, an annual list of black influencers. She has given speeches to audiences across the United States of America, from union halls to the United Nations Office of the High Commission on Human Rights.

Additional work
Garza's editorial writing has been published by The Guardian, The Nation, The Feminist Wire, Rolling Stone, HuffPost and Truthout. She currently directs Special Projects at the National Domestic Workers Alliance.

Previously, Garza had served as the director of People Organized to Win Employment Rights (POWER) in the San Francisco Bay Area. During her time in the position, she won the right for youth to use public transportation for free in San Francisco, and campaigned against gentrification and police brutality in the area. Garza is an active participant in several Bay Area social movement groups. She is on the board of directors of Forward Together's Oakland California branch and is also involved with Black Organizing for Leadership and Dignity. She is also on the board of directors for Oakland's School of Unity and Liberation (SOUL). In 2011, she was the Chair person of Right to the City Alliance

In 2015, Garza was selected as the Member's Choice for Community Grand Marshal at 2015 Pride celebration, as she was considered a local hero in Oakland for her contributions to the LGBTQ community and society at large. Over two dozen Black Lives Matter organizers and supporters marched in the Pride Parade behind Garza, who sat next to transgender rights activist Miss Major, the previous year's Community Grand Marshal.

Notable speeches
Garza presented at the 2016 Bay Area Rising event, speaking about the propagation of Black Lives Matter and human rights.

In 2017, Garza spoke to graduating students from San Francisco State University. In her speech, Garza praised the persistence of the Black women who came before her, saying that they laid the foundation for modern activism: "Were it not for black women, there would be no Underground Railroad, no one to campaign against black bodies swinging from trees like strange fruit, there would be no protest songs like the ones that came from the toes, through the womb up, through the lungs and out of the brilliant mind and mouth of Nina Simone. There would be no black women voting like the 96 percent of us who did vote and said hell no to this administration. There would be no America were it not for black women. This is an ode to black women – because black women are magic. [...] We, I, you and me – we owe everything to black women. [...] Yes – all lives, all contributions. But this? This is bigger than all that. This is about black women, cisgender, transgender, no gender, disabled, queer, immigrant black women who time and time again keep trying to tell y'all and more than that... keep showing y'all. We are magic."

Acts of protest
Garza participated in an attempt to stop a Bay Area Rapid Transit train for four and a half hours, a time chosen to reflect the time that Michael Brown's body was left in the street after he was killed. The protesters stopped the train for an hour and a half by chaining themselves both to the inside of the train and the outside, making it impossible for the door to close. The event ended when police removed the protestors by dismantling part of the train.

Activism in politics

Organization Supermajority 
Supermajority was established in the spring of 2019 and is focused on creating political power for American women. The organization Supermajority was created by Garza, Cecile Richards, and Ai-jen Poo. Supermajority intends to "train and mobilize two million women across America to become organizers, activists, and leaders ahead of the 2020 election" to create a "multiracial, intergenerational movement for women's equality." One of the main goals of Supermajority is to create "'a women's new deal,'" with women's issues like "voting rights, gun control, paid family leave, and equal pay" being seen as "issues that impact everyone" for the 2020 presidency, as well as build a greater platform for women in politics. In the 2020 election, cofounder Cecile Richards says "[the group will be successful] if 54% of voters in this country are women and if we are able to insert into this country the issues that women care about and elect a president who’s committed to doing something about them."

Black Political Power 
In 2018 Garza launched Black Futures Lab, whose goal is to engage with advocate organizations to advance policies that make black communities stronger. The first project for Black Futures Lab was the Black Census Project. This project was the largest survey on Black People since the Reconstruction era of the United States. The survey included questions on subjects such as political attitudes, organization affiliation, experiences with racism and police violence, perceptions of social movements, access to healthcare and economic well-being. Black Future Labs plans to use the results of the Black Census Project to determine pressing legislative and policy issues. Garza divided the Black Census Project into creating separate studies focusing on the black LGBTQ community as well as the black community's political engagement in the United States.

2016 Presidential election 
While Garza has been critical of Donald Trump, she has also been critical of Barack Obama and Hillary Clinton, saying: "The Clintons use black people for votes, but then don't do anything for black communities after they're elected. They use us for photo ops." She voted for Bernie Sanders in the California Democratic Primary, but promised to do everything in her power "to make sure that we are not led by Donald Trump", and she voted for Clinton in the general election.

2020 Presidential election 
Garza gave a speech to a crowd of 200 students on the 2020 elections in celebration of Black History Month. She spoke about how the Black Lives Matter Movement is misinterpreted as being anti-white, anti-law enforcement, or a terrorist organization. In this speech, she showed support for the Green New Deal, condemned voter suppression, and called for more voter involvement. Garza endorsed Elizabeth Warren in the Democratic primary.

Recognition and awards
Garza was recognized on the Root 100 list of African American Achievers between the ages of 25 and 45. She was also recognized on the Politico50 2015 guide to Thinkers, Doers, and Visionaries, along with Cullors and Tometi.

Garza has received the Local Hero award from the San Francisco Bay Guardian. She has been twice awarded by the Harvey Milk Democratic Club the Bayard Rustin Community Activist Award for her work fighting racism and gentrification in San Francisco. She has also been awarded the Jeanne Gauna Communicate Justice Award from the Centre for Media Justice.

In 2015, Garza, Cullors, and Tometi (as "The Women of #BlackLivesMatter") were among the nine runners-up for The Advocates Person of the Year.

In November 2017, Black Lives Matter founders Alicia Garza, Patrisse Cullors and Opal Tometi were awarded the Sydney Peace Prize.

In 2018 Garza was named in the inaugural cohort of the Atlantic Fellows for Racial Equity (AFRE). This first cohort of 29 Atlantic Fellows are focused on challenging racism in the U.S. and South Africa and disrupting the rise of white nationalism and supremacy.

In 2020, Garza was named to Fortune magazine's '40 Under 40' list under the "Government and Politics" category.

Garza is included in Time magazine's 100 Most Influential People of 2020 and on the list of the BBC's 100 Women announced on 23 November 2020.

In 2020, Garza also was number 32 on Fast Company's Queer 50 list. In 2022, she was number 40 on the list.

UC San Diego Commencement 2021 
Alicia Garza will be the keynote speaker at UC San Diego's 2021 Commencement ceremonies, held on June 11–13, 2021. The chancellor of the University, Chancellor Kohsla, said in a report by UC San Diego news, "Alicia Garza’s determination to be a catalyst for change has deeply influenced our campus community, and we are honored to feature her as our Commencement keynote speaker...Her commitment to health equity and rights for domestic workers as well as ending police violence, racism and violence against transgender and gender non-conforming people of color has made a significant impact on the lives of many in our nation and around the world”

References

External links

1981 births
Living people
Activists from Los Angeles
Black Lives Matter people
Writers from Oakland, California
Activists from Oakland, California
LGBT African Americans
LGBT people from California
21st-century African-American women
Queer women
BBC 100 Women
African-American Jews
LGBT Jews
Jewish American writers
Jewish American activists
African-American activists
Women civil rights activists
21st-century American Jews
20th-century African-American people
21st-century LGBT people
20th-century African-American women